Jair Humberto Bernal Sepúlveda (born February 12, 1968 in Tunja, Central Boyacá Province) is a retired male road cyclist from Colombia.

Career

1989
1st in General Classification Vuelta a El Salvador (ESA)
1992
1st in Stage 9 Vuelta a Colombia, Bogotá (COL)
2nd in General Classification Vuelta a Guatemala (GUA)
1996
1st in Stage 6 Clásico RCN, Buga (COL)
1st in Stage 9 Clásico RCN, Santa Helena (COL)
3rd in General Classification Clásico RCN (COL)
1997
2nd in General Classification Vuelta a Colombia (COL)

References
 Profile

1968 births
Living people
People from Tunja
Colombian male cyclists
Vuelta a Colombia stage winners
Sportspeople from Boyacá Department